Madhya Pradesh Lokayukta is the Parliamentary Ombudsman for the state of Madhya Pradesh (India). It is a high level statutory functionary,  created to address grievances of the public against ministers, legislators, administration and public servants in issues related to misuse of power, mal-administration and corruption. It was first formed under the Madhya Pradesh Lokayukta and Deputy Lokayukta Act-1981, and approved by the president of India. The passage of Lokpal and Lokayukta's Act,2013 in Parliament had become law from January 16,2014 and requires each state to appoint its Lokayukta within a year.  A bench of Lokayukta should consist of judicial and non-judicial members. An Upa-Lokayukta is a deputy to Lokayukta and assists him in his work and acts in-charge Lokayukta in case the position fells vacant before time.

A Lokayukta of the state is appointed to office by the state Governor after consulting the committee consisting of State Chief Minister, Speaker of Legislative Assembly, Leader of Opposition, Chairman of Legislative Council and Leader of Opposition of Legislative Council and cannot be removed from office except for reasons specified in the Act and will serve the period of five years.

History and administration 

Madhya Pradesh Lokayukta Act makes provision for serving Chief Justice or Judge in any High Courts of India or a serving Judge in Supreme Court of India to be appointed as its Lokayukta. Additionally the Act gave a provision to appoint a Deputy Lokayukta or Upa-Lokayukta with the eligibility of 1. A person who is serving as Judge in any Indian High Court or 2. a person who has retired from any position with state or central government and having pay scale more than that of an Addl Secretary in Indian Government. Deputy Lokayukta is appointed after consulting Lokayukta.

Madhya Pradesh Lokayukta vacancies are not openly disclosed.

Oath or affirmation

Powers 

Madhya Pradesh Lokayukta has complete and exclusive authority for enquiring into allegations or complaints against the State Chief Minister, State Deputy Chief Minister, Ministers of the state Government, Leader of Opposition and Government officials of serving as Secretary and above Additional Secretary. The enquiry with Upa-Lokayukta or Deputy Lokayukta shall include all other complaints excluding those with powers specifically with the state Lokayukta.

Madhya pradesh Lokayukta is exempted by Right to Information Act to disclose details of search operations conducted by Income Tax Department against the corrupt officials of the state.

Appointment and tenure 

Madhya Pradesh Lokayukta Act made provision for a person appointed to the position of Lokayukta will serve for a period of six years. Members having served in these two positions are not eligible to be reappointed. Madhya Pradesh Government created the provision in Madhya Pradesh Lokayukta Act to further extend the tenure of the Lokayukta and Deputy Lokayukta for a period not more than one year after their retirement in case the State Government fails to appoint anyone in their place.

In 2019, retired judge of Madhya Pradesh High Court Naresh Kumar Gupta was sworn in as State Loka-Ayukta.

Notable cases 

In 2015, law enforcement agencies of Lokayukta had filed a case against Madhya Pradesh Tourism Development Corporation (MPTDC), on a complaint filed by security agency in an issue relating to awarding of a contract on assigning of security in tourist places of the state.

In 2014, the institution had caught around 102 employees of state government with positions ranging from peon to top ranking officials for various offences relating to bribery.

See also 

Lokpal and Lokayukta Act,2013
Gujarat Lokayukta
Telangana Lokayukta
Chhattisgarh Lokayog
Delhi Lokayukta

References

External links 
 official website

Lokayuktas
Madhya Pradesh